This is a list of curling clubs in the Yukon, the Northwest Territories, and Nunavut, the three territories of Canada.

The three bodies that oversee curling in the territories are:
Yukon Curling Association
Northwest Territories Curling Association
Nunavut Curling Association

Northwest Territories

Aklavik Curling Club - Aklavik
Fort Liard Curling Club - Fort Liard
Fort Providence Curling Club - Fort Providence
Fort Resolution Curling Club - Fort Resolution
Fort Simpson Curling Club - Fort Simpson
Fort Smith Curling Club - Fort Smith
Francis J Francis Curling Club - Fort McPherson
Hay River Curling Club - Hay River
Holman Curling Club - Ulukhaktok
Inuvik Curling Club - Inuvik
Norman Wells Curling Club - Norman Wells
Rae/Edzo Curling Club - Behchoko
Yellowknife Curling Club - Yellowknife

Nunavut

Iqaluit Curling Club - Iqaluit
Qavik Curling Club - Rankin Inlet
Ovayok Curling Club - Cambridge Bay

Yukon
There are 8 curling clubs in the Yukon Curling Association:

Atlin Curling Club - Atlin, British Columbia
Carcross Community & Curling Club - Carcross
Carmacks Curling Club - Carmacks
Dawson Curling Club - Dawson
Haines Junction Curling Club - Haines Junction
Mayo Curling Club - Mayo
Teslin Curling Club - Teslin
Whitehorse Curling Club - Whitehorse

References

External links 

 Yukon Curling Association
 Northwest Territories Association
 Nunavut Curling Association

 Yukon
Curling
Curling
Curling
Curling
 Curling
 Curling
Curling in Yukon, the Northwest Territories and Nunavut
Yukon